Kani Sur (also Romanized as Kānī Sūr and Kānīsūr) is a city and capital of Namshir District, in Baneh County, Kurdistan Province, Iran. At the 2006 census, its population was 1,131, in 239 families. The city is populated by Kurds.

References

Towns and villages in Baneh County
Cities in Kurdistan Province
Kurdish settlements in Kurdistan Province